Eva Fleischer, also Eva Fleischer-Fischer (5 May 1922, Wrocław – 8 January 2016, Leipzig) was a German opera contralto and professor at the University of Music and Theatre Leipzig.

Life 
Born in Breslau, Fleischer studied at the Musikhochschule Leipzig, where she became a lecturer in 1951. From 1959 to 1966 she belonged to the ensemble of the Leipzig Opera. In the 1960s she was the subject of several oil paintings  by Bernhard Heisig. From 1966 to 1982 she was professor at the Musikhochschule Leipzig.

She was married to the pianist Rudolf Fischer.

Fleischer died in Leipzig at age 93.

Awards 
 2nd Prize in the Singing category of the International Johann Sebastian Bach Competition 1950
 Nationalpreis der DDR III. Klasse für Kunst und Literatur 1958 ("for her interpretation of German and international classical and progressive songs, expressing her commitment to our State and to the construction of socialism".)
 Robert Schumann Prize of the City of Zwickau (1983).

References

External links 
 Fleischer Eva on Operissimo
 
 Recordings on JPC
 

1922 births
2016 deaths
Musicians from Wrocław
German opera singers
Operatic contraltos
Voice teachers
Academic staff of the University of Music and Theatre Leipzig
East German musicians
East German women